The idea of corporate election expresses a Christian soteriological view that understands Christian salvation as based on "God choosing in Christ a people whom he destines to be holy and blameless in his sight". Put another way, "Election is the corporate choice of the church 'in Christ.'" Paul Marston and  Roger Forster state that the "central idea in the election of the church may be seen from Ephesians 1:4": "For he [God] chose us [the Church] in him [Christ], before the creation of the world to be holy and blameless in his sight." William Klein adds:

Here [in Ephesians 1:3-4] Paul states that God chose Christians in Christ before the creation of the world to be holy and blameless in his sight. The "chosen ones" designate the corporate group to whom Paul writes with himself (and presumably all Christians) included: God chose us. The focus is not on the selection of individuals, but the group of those chosen. As Westcott notes, "He chose us (i.e. Christians as a body, v. 4) for Himself out of the world." Paul specifies the timing of this choice—it was pretemporal, before the world was created. God made the choice "in him" (that is, "in Christ"). In other words, Christ is the principal elected one, and God has chosen a corporate body to be included in him."

Summary of the corporate view of election

Election is Christocentric
Election is first and foremost centered in Christ: "He chose us in him" (Ephesians 1:4a). Christ himself is the elect of God. Regarding Christ, God states, "Here is my servant whom I have chosen" (Matthew 12:18; cf. Isaiah 42:1, 6). God audibly declared to Christ's disciples, "This is My Son, My Chosen One; listen to Him!" (Luke 9:35) The Gospel writer John says, "I have seen and I testify that this is God’s Chosen One" (John 1:34, Today's New International Version). The apostle Peter refers to Christ as "the Living Stone . . . chosen by God and precious to Him" (1 Peter 2:4; cf. v. 6). Therefore, Christ, as the elect of God, is the foundation of our election. Through union with Christ believers become members of the elect (Ephesians 1:4, 6-7, 9-10, 12-13). No one is among the elect unless they are in a living faith union with Christ.

Election is primarily corporate
New Testament theologian Ben Witherington remarks that apart from the word election (eklektos) occasionally being used to apply to the king in the Old Testament, election in the Old Testament is predominantly applied corporately to a people, not to individuals. The Hebrew word for "elect" (bahir) is normally used in the plural, and thus refers collectively of Israel. While there are times in Scripture where God chooses individuals for a specific historical task or purpose (e.g. Cyrus in Isaiah 45:1), these are passages that have nothing to do with God deciding who will be saved, thus, they are of no relevance to this topic. The corporate concept of election in the Old Testament is the context which one must view the references to election in the New Testament.

Professor William Klein concluded that the New Testament writers "address salvific election in primarily, if not exclusively, corporate terms. In other words, God has chosen an elect body to save." The elect are identified corporately as: "the body of Christ" (Ephesians 4:12; cf. 1:22-23; 2:16; 3:6; 5:23, 30), "members of God's household" (Ephesians 2:19), "a chosen race, a royal priesthood, a holy nation, a people for his own possession" (1 Peter 2:9; cf. 2:10). Thus, election is primarily corporate and only embraces individuals (secondarily) who identify and associate themselves with the body of Christ, the church—God's new covenant community.

New Testament scholar Brian Abasciano says that the Bible's teaching regarding "corporate election unto salvation is even more nuanced than simply saying that the group is elected primarily and the individual secondarily."
More precisely, it refers to the election of a group as a consequence of the choice of an individual who represents the group, the corporate head and representative. That is, the group is elected as a consequence of its identification with this corporate representative. The same may be said of individuals. They are chosen as a consequence of their identification with the people, and more fundamentally, with the individual corporate head. Thus,

God chose the people of Israel in Abraham, Isaac, and Jacob/Israel (Deuteronomy 4:37; 7:6-8). That is, by choosing Jacob/Israel, the corporate/covenant representative, God also chose his descendants as his covenant people. . . . The covenant representative on the one hand and the people/nation of Israel on the other hand are the focus of the divine covenantal election, and individuals are elect only as members of the elect people. Moreover, in principle, foreign individuals who were not originally members of the elect people could join the chosen people and become part of the elect, demonstrating again that the locus of election was the covenant community and that individuals found their election through membership in the elect people.
This notion of election is rooted in the Old Testament concept of corporate solidarity or representation, which views the individual as representing the community and identified with it and vice versa.

Election has an eternal purpose
God has chosen a people so that they "may declare the praises of him" who called them out of darkness and into his wonderful light (1 Peter 2:9). Furthermore, God has purposed in Christ that His people will "be holy and blameless before Him" (Ephesians 1:4). This purpose is repeatedly emphasized by Paul in Ephesians (see 2:21; 3:14-19; 4:1-3, 13-32; 5:1-18; cf. 1 Peter 1:2, 14-16). The fulfillment of this purpose for the church corporately is certain (Ephesians 5:27). But the fulfillment of this purpose for individuals in the church is conditional upon remaining in the Christian faith (Colossians 1:22-23).

Election is offered to all people
Abasciano believes that one of the theological advantages of corporate election is how it beautifully coincides with the Bible's teaching that God loves everyone, calls everyone to trust in him and be saved, and genuinely desires all to come into a saving relationship with him (e.g., Luke 19:10; John 3:16; Acts 17:30-31; 1 Timothy 2:4; 2 Peter 3:9). However, only those persons who repent of their sin and place their faith in Christ enter into a saving relationship with God and are "incorporated into Christ's elect body (the church) by the Holy Spirit (1 Corinthians 12:13), thereby becoming one of the elect."

Historical perspectives on election
Historically, both Calvinists and Arminians have predominantly understood election unto salvation as individual. That is, each individual is elected/selected to enter into a saving relationship with God through Christ. The central difference between the two views is that Calvinists see election as unconditional and Arminians see election as conditional on divine foreknowledge of human faith. While corporate election is not the traditional Arminian position, it is totally consistent with Arminian theology because it is a conditional election—conditional upon union with Christ through faith. According to Abasciano, the corporate view of election "has come to command a great deal of scholarly support," and its popularity is likely due to the increased sensitivity of the scholarly community to "the Jewish matrix of early Christianity and the profound indebtedness to the Old Testament on the part of the New Testament authors."

Arguments in support of corporate election

The Old Testament concept of election
Advocates of a corporate view of election argue that the Old Testament concept of election is definitely corporate.  James Daane wrote, "Divine election in its basic Old Testament form is collective, corporate, national. It encompasses a community of which the individual Israelite is an integral part." The dominant use of election terminology in the Old Testament applies to the people of Israel as a body or nation. The Old Testament writers repeatedly declare that God "has chosen Israel out of all the nations of the world to be his own people."

According to Klein, the Old Testament writers used the following corporate terms to express Israel's collective unity: bride; congregation; flock, house; and vine. Furthermore, the term people is used throughout the Old Testament as a collective term for Israel. The writers of the Old Testament used these various terms because they conceived Israel as a people, a corporate entity.

New Testament language on election
Supporters of the corporate view of election point to the New Testament language that explicitly discusses election, which they say is always corporate.  Abasciano says "one will look in vain for an overt use of the language of election unto salvation in reference to an individual."  Klein concluded, "Our study of the New Testament documents demands that we view election to salvation corporately. We found in the synoptics, John, Peter, James, and Paul evidence that God has chosen a people—a community." The apostle Paul calls believers in Rome "the elect ones of God" (Romans 8:33), and speaks of the Church as being chosen in Christ (Ephesians 1:4) and of "your [plural] election" (1 Thessalonians 1:4), "but never with individual language. . . ." Klein says, "Plural language dominates election texts."

Cultural and religious setting for the New Testament
Supporters of a corporate understanding of election say that the first century Mediterranean culture and Judaism was corporate rather than individualistic in outlook.  According to Abasciano, the corporate character of the New Testament 1st-century culture is firmly supported by the scholarly consensus. Bruce Malina argues persuasively in his book, The New Testament World, that the first-century Mediterranean person did not share our idea of an individual. People in the New Testament world conceived of themselves in relation to others, not as separate entities. They viewed people in terms of their family, village, city, or nation. Thus, while individualism dominates our Western thinking, it would have been extremely foreign to the world of the writers of the New Testament.

When you consider the Jewish writers of the Old Testament, you will always find that the "individual's very self-understanding was derived from his or her relationship to the community." The emphasis lies on the individual as a member of the community, not on the individual as an independent being before God. Salvation concerned both the individual and the community of the people of God. One would partake of the salvation which God had provided for his people by living as part of the covenant people. Only through persistent and unrepentant sin could one become apostate and be considered outside the covenant and therefore outside of salvation. Salvation was generally seen as concerning the nation (or a specific group within the nation), and something in which an individual would participate in provided that he kept within covenantal boundaries. Thus, within Judaism we find an interdependence of both the individual and the covenant community.

This means that the dominant perspective of the New Testament culture "was that the group was primary and the individual secondary. The individual, while important, was not thought of as standing on his own, but as embedded in the group of which he was a member. Personal identity was derived from the group rather than the group drawing its identity from the individuals contained in it." Thus, Judaism's and the Old Testament's corporate view of election, the exclusive use of corporate language in connection with election unto salvation, and the corporate orientation of the New Testament writers' socio-historical context all combine to provide a very strong case for seeing election as primarily corporate.

Arguments against corporate election
Despite the growing popularity of corporate election, this doctrine has been criticized by some who hold to individual election, "particularly Calvinists, whose position it directly contradicts." Supporters of the corporate view of election say that these criticisms appear to be misguided and based upon "misunderstandings of the biblical concept of corporate election."

Corporate election excludes individuals
There are many scholars who believe that corporate election excludes individuals from election, and therefore, in order to counter the view, proceed to show how individuals are obviously elect and partakers of election's blessings if the group they belong to is elect. Proponents of corporate election state that this can be shown as a mere assumption through evaluating the descriptions of corporate election. According to Abasciano, corporate election does not exclude individuals because,
it includes individuals, but only insofar as they are part of the group. That is, it includes individuals based on their participation in the group/identification with the corporate representative. Another way of saying this would be that the group is elected primarily and individuals secondarily. Corporate election begins with the individual corporate head and the group, and then moves to the individual. But it does arrive at the individual and allots a full and vigorous role to him in the context of community. It is true that corporate election does not refer to the election of each individual separately from Christ or the group, but this does not in any way nullify the election of each individual member of the group as a result of the group's election. It is also true that corporate election does not refer to the choice of anyone to join the elect people. The concept of covenantal election or election unto eternal salvation simply does not apply to entrance into the elect people. It actually refers to a people being chosen to belong to God, to receive the benefits of his covenant promises (ideally), and to live according to his covenant commands (Genesis 18:19; Deuteronomy 4:20; 7:6-9; 14:2; Psalm 135:4; Ephesians 1:4ff.; 1 Peter 2:9-10). All of this applies to each individual in the New Covenant as a consequence of membership in the elect people, and more profoundly, of being in Christ by faith, which is what makes someone a part of God's people.

Corporate election is not the election of people, but merely the election of an empty set
It has been suggested that corporate election is the election of an empty set if individuals are not explicitly elected in addition to a corporate model. It has been said that by proponents of this view that this is a misunderstanding that flows naturally out of the first and is not true for the following reasons:
God first chooses the corporate head/representative so that there is never an empty set. Indeed, the corporate head is the foundation of the group and embodies the group in himself. To put it bluntly and in a way that undoubtedly rubs against individualistic sensibilities, the corporate head is the group, in accordance with the biblical principle of corporate solidarity. As 1 Corinthians 12:12 puts it in relation to Christ, "For just as the body is one and has many members, and all the members of the body, though being many, are one body, so also is Christ." Christ is both an individual and corporate figure. The group is chosen because of its association with him and because it shares in his election. His election extends to all those who are associated with him because they are in him. With the corporate head as the locus of election, there is never a time that the elect people is an empty set.
Another reason given to reject that corporate election is an election of an empty set is seen in the election of a corporate representative in the Old Testament.
For God's Old Testament people were chosen in Abraham, Isaac, and Jacob/Israel. Jacob was chosen in the womb, and at the very same time his descendants were chosen; they were chosen in him. "And the Lord said to her, 'Two nations are in your womb. And two peoples from your belly will be divided. And one people will be stronger than the other people. And the older will serve the younger' (Genesis 25:23). Notice how Jacob is wholly identified with his people before they exist. His election is their election; his destiny is their destiny. Indeed, they will be called by his personal name, whether Jacob or Israel. Both are designations for the nation of Israel in the Old Testament.
Was Israel an empty set when Jacob was chosen? One might argue so. But then that would prove too much. It would constitute an argument against the concept of the election of God's people found in the Old Testament as somehow not really the election of people. For Israel was chosen in Jacob. That is, the people Israel was chosen as a consequence of the man Israel's election. When he was chosen, they were chosen. As Gen. 25:23 indicates, it could be said that the nation was in Rebekah's womb because Jacob was. And as Malachi 1:2-3 affirms, God loved/chose the people Israel by loving/choosing Jacob. . . .
Thus, Abasciano argues that while it might be the tendency of people with an individualistic viewpoint to regard the people of God as an empty set when only the corporate representative of the people is actually in the covenant, it is not the view found in the Scriptures. It is also unlikely that such a view would be held in a collectivist culture, the very one in which the Old and New Testaments were written, which viewed the group as primary and the individual as secondary. The individualistic viewpoint is not able to account for the principle of corporate solidarity that, according to Abasciano, fits so well in the Bible and collectivist thought. The biblical world saw the corporate representative as embodying the people he represents from the beginning of his representative role or election. If there is never an empty set in the Old Testament's corporate election of Israel in their chosen corporate representative, then this would likewise be true of "the church's election before the foundation of the world because that election was in Christ, consequent on his election, which is foundational to the election of his people in his capacity as their corporate representative (Ephesians 1:4)."

Relation to other theological issues

Predestination
Predestination (Greek: prooizo) means 'to decide beforehand' and refers to God's purposes encompassed in election. Election is God's choice 'in Christ' of a people (the true church) for himself. Predestination encompasses what will happen to God's people (all genuine believers in union with Christ). Paul uses the word predestination in five of its six occurrences in the New Testament. For Paul, predestination has emphasis on Christians corporately and on the future and final goals God has prepared for those in union with Christ. Predestination is concerned with what God has determined beforehand on behalf of those who are (or will be) Christians, not how certain people become Christians nor who will become Christians. No one is predestined to become a Christian, but rather, as Christians (collectively) we have a glorious future destiny awaiting us. God has predestined his elect ones "to be conformed to the image of his Son" (Romans 8:29); to "adoption as sons through Jesus Christ to Himself" (Ephesians 1:5); and to "bring praise to His glory" (Ephesians 1:11-12). Like election, predestination refers to the corporate body of Christ and encompasses individuals only in connection with that body through an abiding faith in Jesus Christ (Ephesians 1:5, 7, 13; cf. Acts 2:38-41; 16:31).

Analogy for corporate election and predestination
The relationship of corporate election and predestination could be compared to a ship (i.e., the church, the body of Christ) on its way to its future and final destination (i.e., conformity to the image of Christ). The ship is chosen by God to be his very own vessel. Christ is the chosen Captain and Pilot of this chosen ship. God desires that everyone would come aboard this ship and has graciously made provisions for them to do so through its Captain. Only those who place their trust in the Captain of the ship are welcomed to come on board. As long as they remain on the ship, through a living faith in the ship's Captain, they are among the elect. If they choose to abandon the ship and its Captain through unbelief, they cease to be among the elect. Election is experienced only in union with the Captain and his ship. Predestination tells us about the ship's future direction and final destination that God has prepared for those remaining on it. God, out of his immense love, invites everyone to come aboard the ship through faith in the ship's Captain, Jesus Christ.

Corporate election as it relates to perseverance and apostasy
Ben Witherington sees the concept of election being inter-connected with the concepts of predestination and perseverance. One's view of election will affect, if not determine, how one views the saint's perseverance. If one believes that God chose some individuals before the foundation of the world to be saved, then it necessarily follows that one has to believe that apostasy is impossible for a genuine Christian person, someone who is truly one of the elect. But there are just too many warnings in the New Testament that warn Christians about falling prey to temptation, or about making a shipwreck of their faith, about grieving or quenching the Holy Spirit in their lives, or about committing apostasy or the unforgivable sin. If this can happen to real Christians who have been indwelt by the Holy Spirit, and who have been destined in advance to be conformed to the image of Christ, but these sins can be committed and would result in a fall from salvation, then something is wrong with the Calvinist concept of election. For Paul, election is a corporate thing. It was in ethnic Israel, but now it is in union with Christ. Paul’s viewpoint of election is simply, according to Witherington, an adaptation of the view found in early Judaism, where one's "election" does not guarantee the final salvation of an individual Christian any more than it guaranteed the final salvation of an individual Israelite in the past. Since "apostasy was and could be committed by individual Israelites, whom God then broke off from the people of God, at least temporarily (see Romans 11:11-24), so there was also the same danger for individual Christians, hence all the warnings about falling away . . . ."
Robert Shank argues that the certainty of election and perseverance is not given to individual men unconditionally, but rather to the church (ekklēsia), the corporate body of all who are in a faith union with Christ, God's Chosen and righteous Servant (Isaiah 42:1-7; 49:1-12; 52:13–53:12; 61:1, 2).

For Shank it was faulty to assume that final salvation with God is inevitable for everyone who has once entered into a saving relationship with Christ since this ignores the many explicit warnings found not only elsewhere in the Scriptures, but in the Colossians passage just quoted.

B.J. Oropeza argues in a similar manner but from different passages. Based on his understanding of what Paul is communicating to his readers in 1 Corinthians 10 and Romans 9-11, Oropeza questions the assumption that unconditional election unto final salvation is guaranteed for the individual Christian, as is argued by some in Romans 8:28-39. Since Paul seems to consider both Israel and Christians as corporately elect in Romans 9-11, then, when election with the goal of final salvation is in view, Paul seems to be speaking of communities rather than individuals. The predestination and election of Christians in Romans 8:29-30 appears to rest on Paul's assumption that election unto final salvation concerns the election of a community rather than individuals. Paul uses plural and collective words such as "those," "many," and so forth to refer to the Christians in 8:28-39. Like the Christian community, Israel itself is called, elect, and beloved of God (Romans 11:28-29; cf. 11:2), yet many in Israel committed apostasy so that in the present age, they do not partake of God's salvation. The corporate election of Israel is definitely in view when Paul states that all Israel will be saved in the "not yet" future (Rom. 11:26). Nevertheless, right now, in this present age, as Romans 11 and 1 Corinthians 10 suggests, individuals and subgroups who are part of the elect community (whether Jews or Gentiles) can fall into unbelief (i.e., commit apostasy) and be cut off from salvation (cf. Romans 11:22).

Oropeza goes on to add that if Paul is addressing the assurance of election to final salvation in Romans 8:28-39, then this promise appears to be tied to a community rather than individuals per se. First, as in 1 Corinthians 10, Paul's employs the Deuteronomic tradition as a background for his arguments in Romans chapters 9-11. In this tradition, Paul appears to hold to a corporate view of election (cf. Deuteronomy 7:6ff) while at the same time believing that apostasy can happen to individuals and sub-groups (cf. Deuteronomy 13:1ff; 29:18-20). This is evident in Romans 8 where Paul warns believers that if they live after the flesh they must die (i.e., become eternally separated from God; see Romans 8:12-13 cf. 11:22; 14:13, 15, 23). But in 8:28-39, Paul does not contemplate whether personal sin or unbelief could finally sever a Christian from their saving relationship with God. Therefore, the promise of final salvation in this passage does not necessarily apply to those Christians who are living according to flesh. In other words, Paul seems to affirm in 8:28-39 that the corporate community is foreknown, predestined and elect in the eternal plan of God and will persevere to final glorification. This would provide a great source of comfort to Paul’s readers when he mentions the various trials that the Christians in Rome may face. The readers, as individuals, can find comfort in the promises of this passage, but only if they remain members of the Christian community. This passage focuses on the Christian community as elect, rather than on the Christian individual. A person who is not residing in this community has no claim to partake of its promises.

Oropeza concludes that Paul's use of the terms predestination and election in Romans 8:28-39 give no necessary indication that genuinely elect individuals cannot commit apostasy. Paul believed that God can choose, foreknow, and predestine an elect people to final salvation even though individual members can fall away due to unbelief (cf. Romans 11). Some elect may apostatize, perhaps even most, but never all.

Paul's thought here is consistent with many ancient Israelite traditions which portray the reality of individual and sub-group apostasies within the elect community while at the same time maintaining the continuity of that community as a whole. In every episode of Israel's tradition history, a faithful remnant survives after apostasy and judgment/expulsion occur (e.g., Deuteronomy 4:23-31). Paul habitually cites or echoes the Jewish traditions for authoritative support of his arguments, and for him, there is an analogy between Israel and Christians in relation to election (Romans 11; 1 Corinthians 10). It seems implausible that he would have divorced himself so completely from the presuppositions of his Jewish heritage that he now teaches that individuals which make up the elect body are each unconditionally preserved so as to never be able to completely fall away.

Notes

References

 Abasciano, Brian J. "Corporate Election in Romans 9: A Reply to Thomas Schreiner," JETS 49/2 (June 2006) 351-71.
 Abasciano, Brian J. "Clearing Up Misconceptions about Corporate Election," Ashland Theological Journal 41 (2009) 67-102.
 Arrington, French L. and Stronstand, Roger, editors. "Ephesians," J. Wesley Adams with Donald C. Stamps (posthumously), Life in the Spirit New Testament Commentary (Grand Rapids: Zondervan, 1999).
 Brand, Chad Owen, editor. Perspectives on Election: Five Views (Nashville: Broadman & Holman Publishers, 2006).
 Burge, Gary M. NIV Application Commentary: John (Grand Rapids: Zondervan, 2000).
 Carson, D. A. The Gospel According to John (Grand Rapids: William B. Eerdmans Publishing Company, 1991).
 Erickson, Millard J. Introducing Christian Doctrine, edited by L. Arnold Hustad (Grand Rapids: Baker Academic, 2005).
 Klein, William W. The New Chosen People: A Corporate View of Election (Grand Rapids: Academie Books/Zondervan, 1990). Second revised and updated edition, Eugene: Wipf and Stock, 2017. 
 Marston, Paul and Forster, Roger. God's Strategy in Human History, expanded edition (Eugene: Wipf and Stock Publishers, 2000).
 Oropeza, B. J. Paul and Apostasy: Eschatology, Perseverance, and Falling Away in the Corinthian Congregation (Tübingen: Mohr Siebeck, 2000).
 Oropeza, B. J. Jews, Gentiles, and the Opponents of Paul: The Pauline Letters. Apostasy in the New Testament Communities, volume 2 (Eugene: Cascade, 2012). 
 Picirilli, Robert. Grace, Faith, Free Will. Contrasting Views of Salvation: Calvinism and Arminianism (Nashville: Randall House Publications, 2002).
 Shank, Robert. Elect in the Son: A Study of the Doctrine of Election (Minneapolis: Bethany House Publishers, 1970).
 Shank, Robert. Life in the Son: A Study of the Doctrine of Perseverance (Minneapolis: Bethany House Publishers, 1960).
 Snodgrass, Kyle. NIV Application Commentary: Ephesians (Grand Rapids: Zondervan, 1996).
 Stamps, Donald C., General Editor, Life in the Spirit Study Bible (Grand Rapids, Zondervan, 1992, 2003).
 Storms, C. Samuel. Chosen For Life: An Introductory Guide to the Doctrine of Divine Election (Grand Rapids: Baker, 1987).
 Thornhill, A. Chadwick. The Chosen People: Election, Paul and Second Temple Judaism (Downers Grove: IVP Academic, 2015).
 Witherington, Ben. The Problem with Evangelical Theology: Testing the Exegetical Foundations of Calvinism, Dispensationalism and Wesleyanism (Waco: Baylor University Press, 2005).

External links
Calvinist views on corporate election
 Excursus on Election – Is it Corporate or Individual? by Michael Browne
 Corporate Election - Article from Theopedia.com

Arminian views on corporate election'''
 "A Concise Summary of the Corporate View of Election and Predestination from an Arminian Perspective"
 "Is Corporate Election Merely Virtual Election? A Case Study in Contextualization" by William W. Klein
 "On the Corporate Perspective of Paul and His Culture, the Translation of Rom 9:6b, and Corporate Election in Romans 9" by Brian J. Abasciano
 "Corporate Election in Romans 9: A Reply to Thomas Schreiner," Journal of the Evangelical Theological Society 42 (2006): 351-71 by Brian J. Abasciano
 Brian J. Abasciano, "Clearing Up Misconceptions about Corporate Election", Ashland Theological Journal 41 (2009): 67-102 by Brian J. Abasciano

Arminianism
Salvation in Protestantism
Christian terminology